Bhasan Char, also known as Char Piya, is an island in Hatiya Upazila, Bangladesh. Until 2019 it was known as Thengar Char.

History 
The island was formed by Himalayan silt in 2006. It spans . The Government of Bangladesh planned to construct a total of 1,440 buildings, including 120 cyclone shelters, to relocate 100,000 Rohingya refugees from the mainland camps of Cox's Bazar. The Government of Bangladesh first suggested resettling Rohingya refugees on the island in June 2015. The proposal was characterized by the United Nations Refugee Agency as "logistically challenging". On January 26, 2017, the Bangladeshi government ordered their resettlement nonetheless. Human Rights Watch called it "a human rights and humanitarian disaster in the making".

In August 2019 the government announced an expansion of the Ashrayan Project (Ashrayan-3) to build 100,000 homes. The houses are built four feet above the ground, in order to protect the refugees from high tidal waves. The public works had amounted to 309.5 million takas by December 2019, a 34% increase from the initial allocation. The Bangladesh Navy built much of the infrastructure.

In January 2020, the project was moving forward despite opposition from Rohingya leaders and human rights groups. Bangladesh's minister for refugee affairs stated the island is "ready for habitation", though he gave no timetable for the relocation. The government had not permitted foreign journalists or Rohingya leaders to travel to Bhasan Char at the time.

Between December 2020 and January 2021 the first two groups totalling around 4,000 Rohingya had already been sent to the island. On the 29th of January another 1,778 Rohingya refugees started their journey to the island, with a fourth group to be moved the next day. The process of moving Rohingya refugees will continue until 100,000 have arrived in the island, according to authorities. The Bangladesh government had spent $112 million by this time. A United Nations delegation visited the island for the first time from 17 to 20 March 2021. By this time 13,000 Rohingya lived on the island. The UN Refugee Agency has signed a memorandum in helping the refugees here. The Rohingya may work and contribute to the economy, but may not move off the island. In principle, the island was seen as a temporary solution until the refugees could return home. Some of the first group to move to the island spoke of being coerced. Others spoke of deciding to relocate from the overcrowded camps of Cox's Bazar due to the frequent violence there. The Bangladesh government hoped to assuage UN concerns and that the refugees would get international assistance.

As of May 2022, the Government of Bangladesh has relocated approximately 28,000 Rohingya refugees to Bhasan Char.

References

Islands of the Bay of Bengal
New islands
Islands of Bangladesh
Hatiya Upazila